Hutton Buscel is a village and civil parish in the Scarborough 
district of North Yorkshire, England.

According to the 2011 UK census, Hutton Buscel parish had a population of 320, an increase on the 2001 UK census figure of 314.

History

Hutton-Buscel derives its name from it having been the "High town of the Buscel or Bushel family" whose ancestors arrived following the Norman conquest.

The parish church of St Matthew is a Grade I listed building. It was built in the 12th century with additions in the 13th and 15th centuries and it underwent restoration by William Butterfield in 1855. Among the monuments in the church is one dedicated to Richard Osbaldeston, Bishop of London, who died in 1764.

Edward Baines, in his 1823 directory, lists the village as Hutton Bushel and gives the population as 419. The manor of Hutton-Buscel was purchased from the Osbaldeston family in 1839, by Marmaduke Langley. By 1848 the population had increased to 506 in the township and 811 in the parish.

Film appearances

The film Smoking/No Smoking is set in Hutton Buscel.

References

External links

Villages in North Yorkshire
Civil parishes in North Yorkshire